Asayish (also spelled Asayiş), the Kurdish term for "security", or Asayesh may refer to:

Asayish (Kurdistan Region), the official security organisation of the autonomous Kurdistan Region of Iraq
Asayish (Rojava cantons), the police force of the cantons within the Democratic Federation of Northern Syria (Rojava)
Asayesh, a village in Iran's East Azerbaijan Province
Dehkadeh-ye Asayesh, a village in Iran's West Azerbaijan Province
Asayiş, Sungurlu